Berks, Bucks and Oxon Championship was a division at level 9 of the English rugby union system featuring teams from Berkshire, Buckinghamshire and Oxfordshire. Promoted teams moved up to the Berks/Bucks & Oxon Premier and there was no relegation. Each year three teams (one each from the Berkshire, Buckinghamshire and Oxfordshire unions) were picked to take part in the RFU Junior Vase (a national cup competition for clubs at levels 9-12).

Originally the league was set up as Bucks & Oxon 2 and then Berks/Bucks & Oxon 2 before being disbanded in 2003–04 as the league was restructured to cater for the joining of many second, third and fourth teams and was split into regional divisions. The league returned in 2011–12 to contain only first teams (along with Berks/Bucks & Oxon Premier) while the second, third and fourth teams were transferred to newly created regional leagues with Berks/Bucks & Oxon 1 at the pinnacle and no possibility of promotion to the championship or the league system above it.

At the end of the 2018–19 the league was discontinued.  Teams that were not promoted into the Berks/Bucks & Oxon Premier were transferred into regional Berks/Bucks & Oxon leagues.

Teams 2019–20

Teams 2018–19

Teams 2017–18

Participating clubs

2016–17
 Aldermaston
 Berkshire Shire Hall
 Chipping Norton (relegated from Berks/Bucks & Oxon Premier)
 Faringdon
 Farnham
 Harwell
 Littlemore
 Oxford
 Wheatley (relegated from Berks/Bucks & Oxon Premier)

2015–16
The 2015–16 Berks/Bucks & Oxon Championship consisted of nine teams; five from Oxfordshire and two each from Berkshire and Buckinghamshire. The season started on 12 September 2015 and was due to end on 23 April 2016.

Participating teams and location
Six of the twelve teams participated in last season's competition. The 2014–15 champions Risborough were promoted to the Berks/Bucks & Oxon Premier along with runners up, Crowthorne while Oxford are new to the league having previously been playing friendly matches over the past season.  As the basement league in Berks/Bucks & Oxon there was no relegation - although there are a number of leagues below it, mainly for second teams.

2014–15
 Aldermaston
 Berkshire Shire Hall
 Crowthorne
 Didcot
 Faringdon
 Farnham Royal (relegated from Berks/Bucks & Oxon Premier)
 Harwell
 Risborough

2013–14
 Abingdon
 Aldermaston
 Berkshire Shire Hall
 Crowthorne 
 Didcot
 Faringdon
 Harwell (relegated from Berks/Bucks & Oxon Premier)
 Kingsclere
 Risborough (relegated from Berks/Bucks & Oxon Premier)
 Wheatley 
 Winslow

2012–13

 Abingdon
 Aldermaston
 Berkshire Shire Hall
 Chesham
 Crowthorne
 Didcot
 Farnham Royal
 Faringdon
 Kingsclere
 Wheatley 
 Winslow

Original teams
When league rugby began in 1987 this division (known as Bucks/Oxon 2) contained the following teams from Buckinghamshire and Oxfordshire:

Chesham
Chipping Norton
Cholsey
Drifters
Gosford All Blacks
Harwell
Milton Keynes
Olney
Phoenix
Wheatley

Berks/Bucks & Oxon Championship honours

Bucks/Oxon 2 (1987–1993)

Originally known as Bucks/Oxon 2, it was a level 9 league for clubs based in Buckinghamshire and Oxfordshire.  Promotion was to Bucks/Oxon 1 and there was no relegation.

Bucks/Oxon 2 (1993–1996)

The creation of National League 5 South for the 1993–94 season meant that Bucks/Oxon 2 dropped to become a tier 10 league.  Promotion continued to Bucks/Oxon 1 and there was no relegation.  The division would be cancelled after the 1995–96 due to the merging of the two Bucks/Oxon divisions into a single league known as Bucks/Oxon.

Bucks/Oxon 2 (1997–1999)

The resplitting of Bucks/Oxon into two divisions ahead of the 1997–98 season, saw the return of Bucks/Oxon 2 after a single season - this time as a tier 9 league.  Promotion continued to Bucks/Oxon 1 and there was no relegation.  After two seasons the division was cancelled again due to the remerging of Bucks/Oxon 1 and Bucks/Oxon 2 into a single Bucks/Oxon division.

Berks/Bucks & Oxon 2 (2000–2004)

Restructuring ahead of the 2000–01 season would see Berkshire based clubs join the Bucks & Oxon leagues.  This also saw the reintroduction of Bucks/Oxon 2, remaining a tier 9 league, but this time called Berks/Bucks & Oxon 2.  Promotion was to Berks/Bucks & Oxon 1 (formerly Bucks/Oxon 1) and there was no relegation.  At the end of the 2003–04 season, the renaming of Berks/Bucks & Oxon 1 to Berks/Bucks & Oxon Premier, meant that Berks/Bucks & Oxon 2 would be cancelled and all clubs transferred to the new regionalised Berks/Bucks & Oxon 1 (replacing Berks/Bucks & Oxon 2).

Berks/Bucks & Oxon Championship (2011–2019)

The Berks/Bucks & Oxon Championship was introduced as a tier 9 league ahead of the 2011–12 season, replacing Berks/Bucks & Oxon 1 as the second division Berks/Bucks & Oxon league.  Promotion was to the Berks/Bucks & Oxon Premier and there was no relegation.

Number of league titles

Drifters (4)
Wheatley (4)
Littlemore (3)
Phoenix (2)
Risborough (2)
Abingdon (1)
Bicester (1)
Bletchley (1)
Chesham (1)
Chipping Norton (1)
Cholsey (1)
Farnham Royal (1)
Harwell (1)

Notes

See also
 South West Division RFU
 Berkshire RFU
 Buckinghamshire RFU
 Oxfordshire RFU
 English rugby union system
 Rugby union in England

References 

Rugby union leagues in the English Midlands
Rugby union in Buckinghamshire
Rugby union in Oxfordshire
Rugby union in Berkshire